S14, SB14, SM14 are disability swimming classifications used for categorising swimmers based on their level of disability.

Definition
This classification is for people with intellectual disabilities.

History
The classification was created by the International Paralympic Committee  and has roots in a 2003 attempt to address "the overall objective to support and co-ordinate the ongoing development of accurate, reliable, consistent and credible sport focused classification systems and their implementation."

For the 2016 Summer Paralympics in Rio, the International Paralympic Committee had a zero classification at the Games policy.  This policy was put into place in 2014, with the goal of avoiding last minute changes in classes that would negatively impact athlete training preparations. All competitors needed to be internationally classified with their classification status confirmed prior to the Games, with exceptions to this policy being dealt with on a case-by-case basis.

Competitors

Swimmers who have competed in this class include Siobhan Paton, Taylor Corry and Mitchell Kilduff of Australia.

See also

Para-swimming classification
Swimming at the Summer Paralympics
T20, the classification for intellectual disabilities in athletics.

References

Swimming at the Summer Paralympics
Parasports classifications